Kim Seung-hee (born July 16, 1968), is a South Korean football manager currently in charge of National League side Daejeon Korail FC in South Korea.

Kim joined Korail FC as a player in 1990 after graduating from Myongji University and spent his entire playing career with the club. He joined the Korail coaching staff in 1999 and became manager ahead of the 2007 season following the retirement of Lee Hyun-chang. His appointment as manager meant that Kim has represented Korail FC as a player, playing coach, assistant manager and also manager.

References 

1968 births
Living people
South Korean footballers
South Korean football managers
Daejeon Korail FC players
Korea National League players
Association football midfielders